The 2016 Dubai Tennis Championships (also known as the 2016 Dubai Duty Free Tennis Championships for sponsorship reasons) was an ATP 500 event on the 2016 ATP World Tour and a WTA Premier on the 2016 WTA Tour. Both events were held at the Aviation Club Tennis Centre in Dubai, United Arab Emirates. The women's tournament took place from 15 to 20 February 2016, while the men's tournament took place from 22 to 27 February 2016.

Points and prize money

Point distribution

Prize money

*per team

ATP singles main-draw entrants

Seeds 

 Rankings were as of February 15, 2016.

Other entrants
The following players received wildcards into the singles main draw:
  Yuki Bhambri 
  Marsel İlhan
  Malek Jaziri

The following players received entry from the qualifying draw:
  Thomas Fabbiano
  Lucas Pouille
  Franko Škugor
  Mikhail Youzhny

Withdrawals
Before the tournament
  Roger Federer (knee injury) → replaced by  Simone Bolelli
  Janko Tipsarević → replaced by  Denis Istomin

Retirements
  Novak Djokovic (eye infection)
  Nick Kyrgios (back pain)

ATP doubles main-draw entrants

Seeds 

 Rankings were as of February 15, 2016.

Other entrants
The following pairs received wildcards into the doubles main draw:
  Mahesh Bhupathi /  Aisam-ul-Haq Qureshi
  Sergei Bubka /  Sergiy Stakhovsky

The following pair received entry from the qualifying draw:
  Hyeon Chung /  Jiří Veselý

WTA singles main-draw entrants

Seeds 

 Rankings were as of February 8, 2016.

Other entrants
The following players received wildcards into the singles main draw:
  Julia Görges
  Simona Halep
  Petra Kvitová
  Karolína Plíšková

The following players received entry from the qualifying draw:
  Jana Čepelová
  Tsvetana Pironkova
  Yaroslava Shvedova
  Zheng Saisai

Withdrawals
Before the tournament
  Timea Bacsinszky (gastrointestinal illness) → replaced by  CoCo Vandeweghe
  Angelique Kerber (right upper thigh injury) → replaced by  Camila Giorgi
  Peng Shuai (right hand injury) → replaced by  Caroline Garcia
  Agnieszka Radwańska (left leg injury) → replaced by  Lesia Tsurenko
  Lucie Šafářová (ongoing illness and bacterial infection) → replaced by  Madison Brengle
  Serena Williams (illness) → replaced by  Barbora Strýcová
  Caroline Wozniacki (left knee injury) → replaced by  Daria Gavrilova

WTA doubles main-draw entrants

Seeds 

 Rankings were as of February 8, 2016.

Other entrants
The following pairs received wildcards into the doubles main draw:
  Fatma Al-Nabhani /  Tsvetana Pironkova
  Petra Kvitová /  Alicja Rosolska

Champions

Men's singles

  Stan Wawrinka def.  Marcos Baghdatis 6–4, 7–6(15–13)

Women's singles

   Sara Errani def.  Barbora Strýcová 6–0, 6–2

Men's doubles

  Simone Bolelli /  Andreas Seppi def.  Feliciano López /  Marc López 6–2, 3–6, [14–12]

Women's doubles

  Chuang Chia-jung /  Darija Jurak def.  Caroline Garcia /  Kristina Mladenovic 6–4, 6–4

References

External links
 Official website

 
2016
Dubai Tennis Championships
Dubai Tennis Championships
Dubai Tennis Championships